SA-Best (stylised SA-BEST), formerly known as Nick Xenophon's SA-BEST, is a political party in South Australia. It was founded in 2017 by Nick Xenophon as a state-based partner to his Nick Xenophon Team party (renamed to Centre Alliance in early 2018). After an unsuccessful 2022 South Australian state election, the party has two representatives in the South Australian Legislative Council, Connie Bonaros and Frank Pangallo, whose current terms expire in 2026.

History

Formation

The party was registered on 4 July 2017. John Darley was the sole Nick Xenophon Team member in the South Australian Parliament until he left the party to become an independent on 17 August 2017.

On 6 October 2017, Xenophon announced that he would be leaving the Federal Senate to contest the state seat of Hartley at the 2018 state election. Xenophon resigned from the Senate on 31 October 2017. 

At its 2018 annual general meeting, the South Australian party officially changed its name from Nick Xenophon's SA-Best to SA-Best. 

In late 2017, NSW-BEST, VIC-BEST, WA-BEST, QLD-BEST and NT-BEST were registered as business names, leading to speculation that the party would expand interstate. However, as of 2022, none of these have formed political parties.

2018 South Australian election
In the March 2018 South Australian election, SA-Best contested thirty-six seats in the South Australian House of Assembly and put forward four candidates for the upper house. The party charged candidates $1,000 to be considered for pre-selection, and a further $20,000 for running in the lower house, or a further $40,000 in the upper house, as well as fund their own local campaign. 

The thirty-six House of Assembly seats contested were:
Badcoe,
Chaffey,
Cheltenham,
Colton,
Croydon,
Davenport,
Dunstan,
Elder,
Elizabeth,
Enfield,
Finniss,
Gibson,
Giles,
Hammond,
Hartley,
Heysen,
Hurtle Vale,
Kavel,
King,
Lee,
Mackillop,
Mawson,
Morialta,
Morphett,
Mount Gambier,
Narungga,
Newland,
Playford,
Port Adelaide,
Ramsay,
Reynell,
Schubert,
Taylor,
Unley,
Waite, and 
Wright.

The party failed to secure any lower house seats, although there was a close contest in the historically safe Liberal seat of Heysen. Xenophon unsuccessfully contested Hartley and although he came second on the primary vote ahead of Labor's Grace Portolesi by 202 votes, the preference distribution of the eliminated fourth-placed Greens candidate turned Xenophon's 99-vote lead over Portolesi into a 357-vote deficit. Third-placed Xenophon was therefore eliminated, with Hartley reverting to the traditional Liberal vs Labor contest. The party came second on primary votes in ten seats; the strongest results were in Chaffey, Finniss, and Hartley, where the party received over 25%. 

In the upper house, SA-Best received 19.3% of the voted, securing two seats, with the election of Connie Bonaros and Frank Pangallo.

2022 South Australian election
At the 2022 South Australian election, SA-Best had one lower house candidate (in the seat of Giles), and two upper house candidates. The party received approximately 1.1% of the upper house vote, and no candidates were elected. 

Upper house members are elected for eight-year terms, so Bonaros and Pangallo’s terms expire in 2026.

Electoral results

Representatives

Legislative Council 
Connie Bonaros Since 2018
Frank Pangallo Since 2018

Mayors
Kris Hanna Mayor for Marion Since 2018.

References

Political parties in South Australia
Centrist parties in Australia
Political parties established in 2017
2017 establishments in Australia